Simen Søraunet Wangberg (born 6 May 1991) is a Norwegian footballer who plays as a defender for Stabæk in Eliteserien.

Club career
He came to Rosenborg as a junior player ahead of the 2008-season, from Nidelv. Before the 2009 season he became a member of the first team. He made his Rosenborg debut in a cup tie against Gjøvik in the spring 2009.

On 7 August 2011, he scored Rosenborg's first goal with his hand in the 3–1 win against Molde.

After playing 24 matches and scoring two goals for Rosenborg in Tippeligaen, he moved to Brann in August 2012. Wangberg was brought to Brann as a replacement for Lars Grorud, who had transferred to Fredrikstad.

In February 2014 Wangberg was sold to Tromsø IL, where he has played 200 matches and scored 14 goals.(25.04.2021).

Career statistics

Club

Honours

Club
Rosenborg
Tippeligaen: 2009, 2010

References

External links
 

1991 births
Living people
Norwegian footballers
Norway under-21 international footballers
Norway youth international footballers
Rosenborg BK players
Ranheim Fotball players
SK Brann players
Tromsø IL players
Eliteserien players
Norwegian First Division players
Association football defenders
Footballers from Trondheim